Ross Growcott (born 24 May 1945) is  a former Australian rules footballer who played with Hawthorn in the Victorian Football League (VFL).

Notes

External links 		
		
		
		
		
		
		
Living people		
1945 births		
		
Australian rules footballers from Victoria (Australia)		
Hawthorn Football Club players